The Ridin' Rascal is a 1926 American silent Western film directed by Clifford Smith and starring Art Acord, Olive Hasbrouck and Buck Connors.

Cast
 Art Acord as Larrabie Keller 
 Olive Hasbrouck as Phyllis Sanderson 
 Buck Connors as Yeager 
 S.E. Jennings
 C.E. Anderson
 Blackie Thompson
 Dudley Hendricks
 William Steele
 Syd Saylor

References

Bibliography
 Munden, Kenneth White. The American Film Institute Catalog of Motion Pictures Produced in the United States, Part 1. University of California Press, 1997.

External links
 

1926 films
1926 Western (genre) films
Universal Pictures films
Films directed by Clifford Smith
American black-and-white films
Silent American Western (genre) films
1920s English-language films
1920s American films